Bill Cook (born 31 May 1937) is a former  Australian rules footballer who played with Geelong in the Victorian Football League (VFL).

Notes

External links 

Living people
1937 births
Australian rules footballers from Victoria (Australia)
Geelong Football Club players
People educated at Geelong College